"Deep in the Heart of Texas" is an American popular song about Texas.

Deep in the Heart of Texas may also refer to:

Deep in the Heart of Texas (film), a black-and-white western released in 1943
"Deep in the Heart of Texas", an episode from the tenth season of the ABC News program, What Would You Do?